Kate Plus 8 (formerly Jon & Kate Plus 8) is an American reality television series starring The Gosselin family. The show premiered on the Discovery Health Channel on April 10, 2007. After two seasons, the series moved to TLC. Following the Gosselins' divorce in 2009, the final episode of Jon & Kate Plus 8 aired on November 23, 2009. The show subsequently returned as Kate Plus 8.

Series overview

Jon & Kate Plus 8 episodes

Season 1 (2007)

Season 2 (2007)
* One-hour episode.

Season 3 (2008)
* One-hour episode.

Season 4 (2008–09)
* One-hour episode.

Season 5 (2009)
* One-hour episode.

Kate Plus 8 episodes

Season 1 (2010)
* One-hour episode.

Season 2 (2011)
* One-hour episode.

Season 3 (2015)
* One-hour episode.

Season 4 (2015–16)
* One-hour episode.

Season 5 (2016–17)
* One-hour episode.

Season 6 (2017)
* One-hour episode.

Specials

Jon & Kate Plus 8

Specials

Kate Plus 8

References

Lists of reality television series episodes